In the foundations of mathematics, classical mathematics refers generally to the mainstream approach to mathematics, which is based on classical logic and ZFC set theory.  It stands in contrast to other types of mathematics such as constructive mathematics or predicative mathematics.  In practice, the most common non-classical systems are used in constructive mathematics.

Classical mathematics is sometimes attacked on philosophical grounds, due to constructivist and other objections to the logic, set theory, etc., chosen as its foundations, such as have been expressed by L. E. J. Brouwer. Almost all mathematics, however, is done in the classical tradition, or in ways compatible with it.

Defenders of classical mathematics, such as David Hilbert, have argued that it is easier to work in, and is most fruitful; although they acknowledge non-classical mathematics has at times led to fruitful results that classical mathematics could not (or could not so easily) attain, they argue that on the whole, it is the other way round.

See also
 Constructivism (mathematics)
 Finitism
 Intuitionism
 Non-classical analysis
 Traditional mathematics
 Ultrafinitism
 Philosophy of Mathematics

References

Mathematical logic